Hippolyte or Hippolyta was the Amazonian queen with a magic girdle, in Greek mythology, and there are other mythological figures named Hippolyte. The name of the amazon, Ἱππολύτη, translates to 'having loosened horses'. The name of her son, Ἱππόλυτος (Hippolytus (son of Theseus)), is taken to be ironically ambiguous, also translating to 'being destroyed by horses', as he dies when his out-of-control chariot horses throw him off.

Hippolyte is the French form of the masculine (Hippolytus) and at the same time the German spelling of the feminine (Hippolyta). 

Hippolyte (variously also Hippolite, Hippolytus, Hippolitus, Hipólito, Ippolit, Ipolit, Ippolito, Ipolito) or Hippolyta (Ippolita) is also used as a given name, and hence as a Caribbean surname.

People with the given name 

 Saint Hippolytus of Rome (3rd century)
 Hippolyte Piré (1778–1850), French general
 Hippolyte André Jean Baptiste Chélard (1789–1861), French composer
 Hippolyte Monpou (1804–1841), French composer
 Hippolyte Pixii (1808–1835), French instrument maker
 Hippolyte Lucas (1814–1899), French entomologist
 Hippolyte Fizeau (1819–1896), French physicist
 Hippolyte Taine (1828–1893), French critic and historian
 Hippolyte Fontaine (1833–1910), French electrical engineer
 Count Hippolyte d'Ursel (1850–1937), Belgian politician and historian
 Hippolyte Aucouturier (1876–1944), French cyclist

Fictional characters

 Hippolyta (Shakespeare), a character in Shakespeare's A Midsummer Night's Dream
 Ippolit Terentyev, character in Dostoevsky's The Idiot
 Ippolit Kuragin, character in Tolstoy's War and Peace
 Ippolit Matveyevich Vorobyaninov, character in Ilf and Petrov's satire The Twelve Chairs
 Hippolyta (DC Comics), a superhero queen in the DC Comics universe
 Hippolyta (Marvel Comics), an Amazon warrior in the Marvel Comics universe
 Hippolyta Trevor, a DC Comics character, also known as Fury
 Hippolyta Freeman, a character from the 2020 television series Lovecraft Country

People with the surname
Saint Lucia
 Emma Hippolyte, Saint Lucian politician
 Kendel Hippolyte (born 1952), Saint Lucian poet and playwright
 Myles Hippolyte (born 1994), Saint-Lucian/Grenadian-English footballer
Surinam
 Ivan Hippolyte (born 1964), Surinamese-Dutch kickboxer
Haiti
Florvil Hyppolite (1828-1896), Haitian president
 Hector Hyppolite (1894–1948), Haitian painter
France
Jean Hyppolite (1907-1968), French philosopher

See also
 Hipólito, a list of people with the given name or surname Hipólito, Hipolito or Hypólito

French masculine given names